Vittorio Morelli of the counts of Popolo of the Marquis of Ticineto (11 May 1888 – 1 April 1963) was an Italian footballer who played as a defender. He competed for Italy in the men's football tournament at the 1912 Summer Olympics.

References

External links
 

1888 births
1963 deaths
Italian footballers
Italy international footballers
Olympic footballers of Italy
Footballers at the 1912 Summer Olympics
Footballers from Turin
Association football defenders
Torino F.C. players
Torino F.C. managers
Italian football managers